Lena Mollers (born 6 January 1990) is a German female volleyball player. She is part of the Germany women's national volleyball team.

She participated in the 2010 FIVB Volleyball Women's World Championship. She played with Rote Raben Vilsiburg.

Clubs
  Rote Raben Vilsiburg (2010)

Awards

Clubs
 2017–18 CEV Champions League -  Runner-Up, with CSM Volei Alba Blaj

References

1990 births
Living people
German women's volleyball players
Place of birth missing (living people)
German expatriate sportspeople in Romania
Expatriate volleyball players in Romania